Malta continued their participation in the Eurovision Song Contest, entering the Eurovision Song Contest 1992 in Malmö, Sweden. The Maltese entry was Mary Spiteri with the song "Little Child", which came third at Eurovision, receiving 123 points.

Before Eurovision

Malta Song for Europe 1992 
The Maltese broadcaster, Public Broadcasting Services (PBS), held a national final, Malta Song for Europe 1992, to select their entry for Malta. The contest was held at the Mediterranean Conference Centre in Valletta on 14 March, hosted by Charles Saliba and Anna Bonanno. Ten songs competed, sung in both Maltese and English. The winner was decided through an expert jury, with only the top three songs announced.

The winner was "Little Child" ("Tfajjel Ckejken"), sung by Mary Spiteri and composed by Georgina Abela and Raymond Mahoney.

At Eurovision
"Little Child", this time solely in English, was performed 10th on the night of the contest, following Cyprus and preceding Iceland. Spiteri came 3rd in the contest with 123 points. This was also Malta's best showing at the contest so far.

Voting

References

External links
Maltese National Final Page

1992
Countries in the Eurovision Song Contest 1992
Eurovision